Miryalguda was a Lok Sabha parliamentary constituency of Andhra Pradesh till 2008.

Members of Parliament

Election results

2004

See also
 Miryalguda
 List of Constituencies of the Lok Sabha

References

Nalgonda district
Former constituencies of the Lok Sabha
2008 disestablishments in India
Constituencies disestablished in 2008
Former Lok Sabha constituencies of Andhra Pradesh